In enzymology, a phylloquinone monooxygenase (2,3-epoxidizing) is an enzyme that catalyzes the chemical reaction

phylloquinone + AH2 + O2  2,3-epoxyphylloquinone + A + H2O

The three substrates of this enzyme are phylloquinone, an electron acceptor AH2, and O2, whereas its three products are 2,3-epoxyphylloquinone, the reduction product A, and H2O.

This enzyme belongs to the family of oxidoreductases, specifically those acting on paired donors, with O2 as oxidant and incorporation or reduction of oxygen. The oxygen incorporated need not be derive from O miscellaneous.

References

 

EC 1.14.99
Enzymes of unknown structure